Wales is an English and Scottish surname. Notable people with the surname include:

 B. Roger Wales (1879–1929), American politician
 Gary Wales (born 1979), Scottish footballer
 Howard Wales (1943–2020), American musician
 Jane Wales (born 1948), American businesswoman
 Jimmy Wales (born 1966), American-British entrepreneur, co-founder of Wikipedia
 Josey Wales, Jamaican musician 
 Joseph Howe Wales (1907–2002), American ichthyologist
 Kourtney Paige Van Wales, American winner of Miss Continental Elite 2013
 Mary T. Wales (1874–1952), American university founder
 Nathaniel B. Wales (1883–1974), American physicist and inventor
 Peter Wales (1928–2008), English cricketer
 Thomas C. Wales (1952–2001), American federal prosecutor and murder victim
 Wally Wales (1895–1980), American film actor born as Floyd Taliaferro Alderson
 William Wales (1734–1798), English astronomer

Fictional characters
 Josey Wales (character), a fictional character played by Clint Eastwood

See also
 Prince William, Duke of Cambridge and Prince Harry (formally Prince Henry of Wales) for some purposes use Wales as surname, especially during their military service
 Wales (disambiguation)

Surnames of Welsh origin
English-language surnames